The Rise and Fall of Qing Dynasty is a long-running four part television series about the history of the Qing dynasty. The series was produced by Hong Kong's ATV and was aired on ATV Home from September 1987 to May 1992.

Four seasons

Season 1
 Title: 滿清十三皇朝; literally: The Thirteen Manchu Qing Dynasties
 Covers the reigns of Nurhaci, Hong Taiji, Shunzhi Emperor and Kangxi Emperor
 68 episodes
 Airing period: September 7 - December 11, 1987

Season 2
 Title: 滿清十三皇朝2; literally: The Thirteen Manchu Qing Dynasties 2
 Covers the reigns of the Yongzheng Emperor, Qianlong Emperor, Jiaqing Emperor and Daoguang Emperor
 50 episodes
 Airing period: June 29 - September 7, 1988

Season 3
 Title: 血染紫禁城; Bloodshed Over the Forbidden Palace
 Covers the reigns of the Xianfeng Emperor and Tongzhi Emperor
 20 episodes
 Airing period: April 5 - September 20, 1990

Season 4
 Title: 危城爭霸 / 皇城爭霸; Battle in the Dangerous City / Battle for the Imperial City
 Covers the reigns of the Guangxu Emperor and Xuantong Emperor
 24 episodes (this season was edited down to 20 episodes when it aired in Hong Kong)
 Airing period: April 27 - May 22, 1992 (this season was produced in 1990, but it was not aired in Hong Kong until 1992)

Plot
The series covered the history of the Qing dynasty during the reigns of its twelve emperors. It started from its early origins as the Later Jin dynasty, founded by Nurhaci in 1616, until its eventual collapse when the last ruler Puyi abdicated in 1912.

Cast

Part 1

Tianming
 Wong Wai as Nurhaci
 Law Shek-ching as Šurhaci
 Jaclyn Chu as Lady Tunggiya
 Liu Yuet-yin as Litai
 Pau Hon-lam as Giocangga
 Leung Kam-san as Taksi
 Fung Tsan as Lady Nara
 Cheng Lui as Nikan Wailan
 Cheung Tsang as Li Chengliang
 Lo Kwok-fai as Li Rubai
 Mak Tsui-han as Monggo
 Yip Ka-man as Monggo (young)
 Kok Chun-kei as Samugu
 Szema Wah Lung as Bamuni
 Siu San-yan as Longdun
 Tam Wing-kit as Sangguli
 Kam San as Anfei Yanggu
 Choi Kwok-hing as Eyidu
 Chan Leung as E'er Guoni
 Ngo Lung as Yangjienu
 Sit Chun-kei as Qingjienu
 Lau Siu-hung as Gehashan
 Lee Hung as Nuomina
 Tsang Tsan-on as Atu
 Ho Shu-pui as Changshu
 Lee Sam as Yangshu
 Lo Fan as Yuelun
 Lee Shau-kei as Suo'erguo
 Ng Wing-sam as Gongzhenglu
 Cheung Chun-wah as Manggūltai
 Ben Ng as Amin
 Poon Yau-shing as Heheli
 Ling Man-hoi as Buzhantai
 Cheng Shu-fung as Jintaiji
 Lee Hon-sing as Buqi
 Tong Kam-tong as Nalan Bulu
 Ho Tim as Sun Gui
 Tsau Wai-kwong as Tu'erge
 Yau Tin-lung as Cuyen
 Kwan Wai-lun as Daišan
 Kwan Tze-biu as Fiongdon
 Yip Yuk-ping as Mukushi
 Eva Lai as Lady Abahai
 Ng Si-tak as Hu'erhan
 Pat Poon as Hong Taiji
 Ting Leung as Xiong Tingbi
 Chan Siu-lung as Yuan Chonghuan
 Lau Suk-fong as Ajigen
 Tsang Mei-ling as Deyinze

Tiancong, Chongde
 Pat Poon as Hong Taiji
 Nora Miao as Consort Zhuang
 Kwan Wai-lun as Daišan
 Eva Lai as Lady Abahai
 Ben Ng as Amin
 Cheung Chun-wah as Manggūltai
 Ling Fei-lik as Jirgalang
 Lee Tze-kei as Abatai
 Ken Lok as Ajige
 Law Lok-lam as Dorgon
 Wong Chi-ning as Dodo
 Yeung Tak-si as Hooge
 Chan Lai-yau as Yoto
 Chan Siu-lung as Yuan Chonghuan
 Leung Hon-wai as Fan Wencheng
 Lee Siu-ling as Fan Wencheng's wife
 Tam Tak-sing as Shuotuo
 Tsau Wai-kwong as Tu'erge
 Sin Po-ming as Dudu
 Cheung Kam as Lengsengji
 Yau Tai-pang as Degelei
 Fan Wing-wah as Mao Wenlong
 Cheung Ping-tsan as Zu Dashou
 Zero Chou as Sumalagu
 Kwan Suet-lai as concubine
 Mang Lai-ping as Empress
 Kwan Wan-ting as concubine
 Yuen Yi-ling as Harjol
 Liu Yuet-yin as Li Lama
 Lau Tsung-kei as the Chongzhen Emperor
 Ho Tim as Yang Chun
 Chan Choi-yin as Mangguji
 Tang Tak-kwong as Shang Kexi
 Leung Ming as Sonin
 Fong Kit as Hong Chengchou

Shunzhi
 Lee Ching-san as the Shunzhi Emperor
 Nora Miao as Empress Dowager Xiaozhuang
 Kwan Wai-lun as Daišan
 Law Lok-lam as Dorgon
 Ling Fei-lik as Jirgalang
 Leung Ming as Sonin
 Zero Chou as Sumalagu
 Chan Leung as Oboi
 Hung Tak-sing as Wu Sangui
 Wong Lai-ying as Chen Yuanyuan
 Lee Hang as Tian Chou
 Sin Kwai-chi as Consort Tunggiya
 Lee Ying-tong as Empress
 Yeung Chung-yan as Mao Xiang
 Ng Ning as Consort Donggo
 Hon Kong as Wang Linxiu
 Tong Pan-cheung as Mao Xisen
 Tsui Yau-pang as Wu Meicun
 Diego Swing as Johann Adam Schall von Bell
 Tong Chi-wing as Wu Liangfu
 Leung Kam-san as Ebilun

Kangxi
 Jason Pai as the Kangxi Emperor
 Chan Chun-nin as the Kangxi Emperor (young)
 Nora Miao as Empress Dowager Xiaozhuang
 Leung Ming as Sonin
 Leung Kam-san as Ebilun
 Chan Leung as Oboi
 Cheung Hung-cheung as Songgotu
 Ma Po-chun as Consort Liang
 Szema Wah Lung as Wei Hui
 Tsau Wai-kwong as Wu You
 Ngo Lung as Mingju
 Lau Chn as Jishi
 Fan Wing-wah as Jieshu
 Lee Ling-kong as Nalan Xingde
 Leung Yin-ling as Lu Ziying
 Wong Lik as Mulima
 Chan Tik-wah as Empress
 Choi Yan-wah as Consort Yu
 Au Yin-lin as Consort De
 Wan Lai-yuk as Consort Rong
 Ha Chi-chan as Consort Tunggiya
 Yu Man-ping as Jin Fu
 Lo Yiu-hung as Wu Guofan
 Tam Wing-kit as Yinzhi
 Wong Wai-leung as Yinreng
 Ng Si-tak as Yinzhi
 Wai Lit as Yinzhen
 Eric Wan as Yinsi
 Tam Tak-sing as Yintang
 Cho Yuen-tat as Yin'e
 Cheung Wai as Yinti
 Hon Kong as Maqi
 Ling Man-hoi as Nian Gengyao
 Lok Wai-ching as Nian Cuiwei
 Kwan Tze-biu as Longkodo
 Poon Yau-shing as E'ling'e
 Chan Tung as Suksaha
 Hung Tak-sing as Wu Sangui
 Wong Lai-ying as Chen Yuanyuan
 Fong Kit as Hong Chengchou
 Leung Hon-wai as Fan Wencheng
 Diego Swing as Johann Adam Schall von Bell

Part 2

Yongzheng
 Wai Lit as the Yongzheng Emperor
 Tang Tak-kwong as Yunxiang
 Eric Wan as Yunsi
 Cheung Wai as Yinti
 Chan Tsik-wai as Yunlu
 Tam Tak-sing as Yintang
 Ling Man-hoi as Nian Gengyao
 Kwan Tze-biu as Longkodo
 Yu Man-ping as Monk Wenjue
 Fan Wing-wah as Yue Zhongqi
 Cheng Shu-fung as Bai Taiguan
 Kwan Wai-lun as Zhang Tingyu
 Chan Choi-yin as Consort Xi
 Au Yin-lin as Consort De
 Lok Wai-ching as Consort Nian
 Ng Wui as Wang Bin
 Hon Kong as Maqi
 Tang Chi-sing as Cai Huaixi
 Fung Chi-wing as Wang Zhaoping
 Ho Tim as Li Siting
 Tsau Wai-kwong as Zeng Jing
 Wing Biu as Zhang Xi
 Ng Wing-sam as Lü Baozhong
 Yip Yuk-ping as Lü Siniang
 Cheung Ping-tsan as Qiurangong
 Chan Siu-lung as Ertai
 Keung Hon-man as Gan Fengchi
 Pau Hon-lam as Chen Shiguan
 Wong Tso-wing as Zhang Guangsi
 Berg Ng as Zhu Rongjing
 Fok Wing-fuk as Hongshi
 Wong Yuen-sun as Hongli
 Ling Fei-lik as Hongzhou
 Chow Sau-lan as Sun Furu
 Hung Tak-sing as Fuheng

Qianlong
 Wong Yuen-sun as the Qianlong Emperor
 Chan Fuk-sang as Lady Fuca
 Tsui Si-fei as Consort Lan
 Tsui Yau-pang as Yunzhe
 Lin Lang as Liang'erji
 Lau Chun as Shaluoben
 Cheung Chun-wah as Heshen
 Yau Tai-pang as Yu Minzhong
 Poon Yau-shing as Liu Tongxun
 Au Oi-ling as Consort Qing
 Ken Lok as Zhou Riqing
 Chan Hiu-ying as Fragrant Concubine
 Chan Tik-wah as Consort Ling
 Lau Tsung-kei as Hongxiao
 Szema Wah Lung as Dazhuomu
 Tsau Wai-kwong as Xiaozhuomu
 Chan Leung as Sule Tansha
 Wong Siu-pang as Ji Yun
 Wong Yue as Yongyan
 Lau Wan-fung as Yongxin
 Cheung Tsang as Liu Yong
 Siu San-yan as Gong'ela
 Ng Tsi-yin as Hexiao
 Lau Siu-kwan as Fuk'anggan
 Wong Hoi-tung as Fengshen Yinde
 Poon Sin-yi as Lady Niuhuru
 Yuen Yi-ling as Lady Hitara
 Wong Ching-ho as Qinggui

Jiaqing
 Wong Yue as the Jiaqing Emperor
 Wong Yuen-sun as the Qianlong Emperor
 Poon Sin-yi as Consort Shun
 Lau Siu-kwan as Fuk'anggan
 Lau Tsung-kei as Fuchang'an
 Cheung Chun-wah as Heshen
 Yuen Yi-ling as Lady Hitara
 Siu San-yan as Gong'ela
 Szema Wah Lung as Zhu Gui
 Tong Kam-tong as Yang Fang
 Chan Leung as Yang Yuchun
 Lau Wan-fung as Yongxin
 Poon Bing-seung as Jiulan
 Kong To as Cao Zhenyong
 Lo Chun-shun as Mianning
 Yeung Chung-yan as Miankai
 Li Ling-kong as Mianxin
 Wong Man-ching as Lady Tunggiya
 Lee Shau-kei as Saichong'e
 Sin Kwai-chi as Lady Dong

Daoguang
 Lo Chun-shun as the Daoguang Emperor
 Wong Man-ching as Consort Shen
 Kong To as Cao Zhenyong
 Yeung Chung-yan as Miankai
 Choi Sin-yu as Consort Quan
 Kingdom Yuen as Consort Xiang
 Wan Suet-kei as Consort Jing
 Choi Kwok-hing as Mujangga
 Lee Hin-ming as Mianke
 Kong Man-shing as Lin Zexu
 Yuen Ling-to as Chen Fu'en
 Kam San as Qishan
 Luk Man-chun as Guan Tianpei
 Wong Yiu-kwong as Deng Tingzhen
 Chan Siu-lung as Du Shoutian
 Chan Kwok-kwong as Yizhu
 Wong Chi-ning as Yicong
 Lo Yiu-hung as Yixin

Part 3 (Xianfeng and Tongzhi)
 Lee Ching-san as the Xianfeng Emperor
 Michelle Yim as Lady Lan
 Tony Liu as Prince Gong
 Sam-sam as Consort Zhen
 Mak Lai-hung as Consort Li
 Fung So-bor as Empress Xiaojing
 Cheng Shu-fung as Yicong
 Yeung Chak-lam as Sushun
 Szema Wah Lung as Baijun
 Lee Ling-kong as An Dehai
 Cheung Tsang as Gui Liang
 Ng Wing-sam as Prince Zheng
 Chan Tsik-wai as Prince Yi
 Tam Wing-kit as Prince Chun
 Wong Lai-ying as Cao Xiulian
 Ban Ban as Ding Xiufeng
 Savio Tsang as Ding Zhaolun
 Chow Sau-lan as Wen Caixia
 Choi Kwok-hing as Wen Gui
 Hung Tak-sing as Yao Yongzhi
 Lau Wan-fung as Shengbao
 Leung Si-ho as the Tongzhi Emperor
 Lee Ching as Lady Arute
 Chan Pui-san as Consort Hui
 Au Yin-lin as Kurun Princess
 Au-yeung Yiu-lun as Zaicheng
 Wong Hoi-ning as Fuqing
 Chan Tung as Zeng Guofan

Part 4 (Guangxu and Xuantong)
 Kent Tong as the Guangxu Emperor
 Sum Sum as Empress Dowager Ci'an
 Susanna Au-yeung as Empress Dowager Cixi
 Suet Lei as Empress Longyu
 Jaime Chik as Consort Zhen
 Ching Lan as Consort Jin
 Hung Tak-sing as Ronglu
 Lo Ching-ho as Li Lianying
 Lam Si-chung as Kurun Princess
 Cheung Tsang as Prince Gong
 Kong Hon as Weng Tonghe
 Ho Shu-san as Kou Liancai
 Kwan Wai-lun as Yixuan (Prince Chun)
 Leung Suk-chong as Princess Consort Chun
 Ling Man-hoi as Li Hongzhang
 Yeung Ka-nok as Kang Youwei
 Tang Tak-kwong as Tan Sitong
 Lee Kong as Liang Qichao
 Yuen Ling-to as Prince Qing
 Wai Lit as Yuan Shikai
 Kong To as Prince Duan
 Lung Ping-kei as Pujun
 Ling Fei-lik as Cui Yugui
 Lo Chun-shun as Zaifeng (Prince Chun)
 Choi Sin-yu as Sixth Princess
 Yim Chau-wah as Puyi
 Lo Tsung-wah as Pujie
 Lau Wan-fung as Zhang Xun
 Tam Tak-sing as Zhang Qinghe
 Leung Kam-san as Eunuch Yuan
 Yip Yuk-ping as Empress Wanrong
 Lau Kam-ling as Wenxiu
 Simon Chui as Zheng Xiaoxu
 Cheng Shu-fung as Lu Zhonglin
 Paul Fonoroff as Reginald Johnston

Theme songs
 Part 1: performed by Chiu San
 Part 2 (Yongzheng and Qianlong): performed by Lo Chun-shun, Chan Fuk-sang, Lee Chun-hung and Keung Pui-lei
 Part 2 (Jiaqing and Daoguang): performed by Lo Chun-shun and Keung Pui-lei
 Part 3: performed by Chiu San
 Part 4: performed by Jaime Chik

Re-airing
The series was re-aired on ATV Home in Hong Kong between October 3 and December 28, 2006.

References

Asia Television original programming
Television series set in the Qing dynasty
Monarchy in fiction
Cultural depictions of Empress Dowager Cixi
Cultural depictions of Puyi